Thomas Stuetzle from the Universite Libre de Bruxelles (ULB), Brussels, Belgium was named Fellow of the Institute of Electrical and Electronics Engineers (IEEE) in 2016 for contributions to the design and engineering of heuristic optimization algorithms.

References

Fellow Members of the IEEE
Living people
Year of birth missing (living people)
Place of birth missing (living people)
Academic staff of the Université libre de Bruxelles